Local government in Scotland comprises thirty-two local authorities, commonly referred to as councils. Each council provides public services, including education, social care, waste management, libraries and planning. Councils receive the majority of their funding from the  Scottish Government, but operate independently and are accountable to their local electorates. Councils raise additional income via the Council Tax, a locally variable domestic property tax, and Business rates, a non-domestic property tax.

Councils are made up of councillors who are directly elected by the residents of the area they represent. Each council area is divided into a number of wards, and three or four councillors are elected for each ward. There are currently 1,227 elected councillors in Scotland. Local elections are normally held every five years and use the single transferable vote electoral system. The most recent election was the 2022 Scottish local elections and the next election will be the 2027 Scottish local elections.

Council administrations typically comprise a group of councillors within the council who are able to command majority support. Minority administrations and majority administrations may be formed. Although coalition administrations are more typical, occasionally a majority administration is formed by a single political party, but this is uncommon due to the proportional voting system used in Scottish local elections. Despite being uncommon on the Scottish mainland, it is possible for independent politicians to form an administration.

The Convention of Scottish Local Authorities (COSLA) is an umbrella organisation formed in 1975 to represent the views of Scotland's thirty-two councils to central government.

History

Origins
The history of Scottish local government mainly surrounds involves the counties of Scotland. The counties have their origins in the sheriffdoms or shires over which a sheriff (a contraction of shire reeve) exercised jurisdiction.

Malcolm III appears to have introduced sheriffs as part of a policy of replacing native "Celtic" forms of government with Anglo Saxon and French feudal structures. This was continued by his sons Edgar, Alexander I and in particular David I. David completed the division of the country into sheriffdoms by the conversion of existing thanedoms.

From the seventeenth century the shires started to be used for local administration apart from judicial functions. In 1667 Commissioners of Supply were appointed in each sheriffdom to collect the land tax. The commissioners eventually assumed other duties in the county. In 1858, police forces were established in each county under the Police (Scotland) Act 1857.

As a result of the dual system of local government, burghs (of which there were various types) often had a high degree of autonomy.

Modern history
Between 1890 and 1975 local government in Scotland was organised with county councils (including four counties of cities) and various lower-level units. Between 1890 and 1929, there were parish councils and town councils, but with the passing of the Local Government (Scotland) Act 1929, the functions of parish councils were passed to larger district councils and a distinction was made between large burghs (i.e. those with a population of 20,000 or more) and small burghs. This system was further refined by the passing of the Local Government (Scotland) Act 1947.

Effective from 1975, the Local Government (Scotland) Act 1973 passed by the Conservative government of Edward Heath introduced a system of two-tier local government in Scotland (see Local government areas of Scotland 1973 to 1996), divided between large regional councils and smaller district councils.  The only exceptions to this were the three island councils, Western Isles, Shetland and Orkney which had the combined powers of regions and districts. The Conservative government of John Major (1990–1997) decided to abolish this system and merge their powers into new unitary authorities. The new councils vary wildly in size – some are the same as counties, such as Clackmannanshire, some are the same as former districts, such as Inverclyde, and some are the same as the former regions, such as Highland. The changes took effect in 1996 with shadow councillors elected in 1995 to oversee the smooth transition of control.

In 2007, council elections moved to the single transferable vote system, with wards represented by either three or four councillors. The transition has resulted in no uncontested seats and has ended single-party controlled councils.

In 2016 there were ward boundary changes in 25 local authority areas, following the Scottish Government accepting some of the recommendations of Local Government Boundary Commission for Scotland.

Responsibilities
 Council Tax
 Non-domestic rates collection
 Maintenance of all roads and pavements (except trunk roads which are the responsibility of Transport Scotland)
 Primary and secondary schooling
 The Planning System, and Section 75
 Parking
 Bus stops 
 Supporting non-commercial bus services
 Provides some Community Transport
 Nurseries 
 Care of the elderly, 
 Protection of vulnerable children and adults
 Refuse collection and disposal  
 Licensing of hours of sale for alcohol
 Licensing of cultural music parades 
 Licensing of taxis and private hire vehicles
 Licensing of window cleaners, market traders, scrap metal merchants, and street hawkers
 Licensing of sexual entertainment venues
 Food Hygiene inspections
 Regulation of landlords
 Arm's Length Council leisure centres and swimming baths 
 Public parks
 Administering the Scottish Welfare Fund

Map

Governance and administration

The power vested in local authorities is administered by elected councillors.  There are currently 1,227 councillors, each paid a part-time salary for the undertaking of their duties. In total, there are 32 unitary authorities, the largest being the City of Glasgow with more than 600,000 inhabitants, the smallest, Orkney, with just over 20,000 people living there (population of 21,670 in 2015).

Councillors are subject to a Code of Conduct instituted by the Ethical Standards in Public Life etc. (Scotland) Act 2000 and enforced by the Standards Commission for Scotland. If a person believes that a councillor has broken the code of conduct they make a complaint to the Commissioner for Ethical Standards in Public Life in Scotland (CESPLS). The Commissioner makes a determination on whether there is a need for an investigation, and then whether or not to refer the matter to the Standards Commission.

Convener (Provost)
Each council elects a convener from among the members of the council to chair meetings and to act as a figurehead for the area.  A council may also elect a depute convener, though this is not required.  In the four city councils in Scotland – Glasgow, Edinburgh, Aberdeen and Dundee – the convener is called a Lord Provost, whilst in other councils the council may choose another title for their conveners. Most councils use the term 'provost'.

The office of provost or convener is roughly equivalent to that of a mayor in other parts of the United Kingdom. Traditionally these roles are ceremonial and have no significant administrative functions. Lord provosts in the four city councils have the additional duty of acting as Lord Lieutenant for their respective city.

Leader of the Council
The Leader of the Council is elected as the leader of the largest political grouping of councillors. The Leader of the Council has no executive or administrative powers designated by statute, but the position is salaried. There is also a Depute Leader of the Council appointed.

Each political group within the council typically appoints a leader, with the largest grouping's leader becoming 'Leader of the Council', and being the central figure of de facto political authority.

Officers
Officers of a council are administrative, non-political staff of the council. Generally the composition of the council's officers are a matter for the council, but there are a number of statutory officers whose roles are defined by the central government.

The most significant of these officers is the Head of Paid Service, usually titled the Chief Executive. The Chief Executive is similar in function to a city manager, though certain councillors have executive authority and there is no clear division of powers.

There is also a statutory Monitoring Officer, who usually heads the Legal Services division of the council, as well as a Chief Financial Officer.

2022 election results

|- style="background-color:#E9E9E9;
! scope="col" colspan="2" rowspan=2 | Party
! scope="col" colspan="3" | First-preference votes
! scope="col" colspan="2" | Councils
! scope="col" colspan="2" | 2017 seats
! scope="col" colspan="3" | 2022 seats
|-
! scope="col" | Count
! scope="col" | Of total (%)
! scope="col" | Change
! scope="col" | Count
! scope="col" | Change
! scope="col" | Count
! scope="col" | Of total (%)
! scope="col" | Count
! scope="col" | Of total (%)
! scope="col" | Change
|-
| style="background-color:"|
| style="text-align:left;" |No overall control
| colspan=3 
| 27
|style="background-color:#ffe8e8;"| 2
| colspan=2 
| colspan=3 
|-
| style="background-color:"|
| style="text-align:left;" |SNP
|633,252
|34.1%
| 1.8%
|1
|style="background-color:#dfd;"| 1
|431
|37.0%
|453
|35.1%
|style="background-color:#dfd;"| 22
|-
| style="background-color:"|
| style="text-align:left;" |Labour
|403,243
|21.7%
| 1.6%
|1
|style="background-color:#dfd;"| 1
|262
|21.4%
|281
|23.1%
|style="background-color:#dfd;"| 19
|-
|-
| style="background-color:"|
| style="text-align:left;" |Conservative
|364,824
|19.6%
| 5.7%
|0
| 
|276
|22.5%
|214
|17.5%
|style="background-color:#ffe8e8"| 62
|-
| style="background-color:"|
| style="text-align:left;" |Liberal Democrats
|159,815
|8.6%
| 1.7%
|0
| 
|67
|5.5%
|87
|7.1%
|style="background-color:#dfd;"| 20
|-
| style="background-color:"|
| style="text-align:left;" |Independents
|156,815
|8.4%
| 2.0%
|3
| 
|168
|14.1%
|152
|12.2%
|style="background-color:#ffe8e8;"| 15
|-
| style="background-color:"|
| style="text-align:left;" |Green
|110,791
|6.0%
| 1.9%
|0
| 
|19
|1.6%
|35
|2.9%
|style="background-color:#dfd"| 16
|-
| style="background-color:"|
| style="text-align:left;" |Alba
|12,335
|0.7%
|
|0
|
|
|
|
|0.0%
| 
|-
| style="background-color:"|
| style="text-align:left;" |Scottish Family
|6,857
|0.4%
|
|0
|
|
|
|
|0.0%
| 
|-
| style="background-color:"|
| style="text-align:left;" |West Dunbartonshire Community
|1,462
|0.1%
|
|0
|
|
|
|1
|0.1%
|
|-
| style="background-color:"|
| style="text-align:left;" |Scottish Socialist
|1,058
|0.1%
|0.1%
|0
|
|
|
|
|0.0%
|
|-
| style="background-color:"|
| style="text-align:left;" |TUSC
|1,022
|0.1%
|
|0
|
|
|
|
|0.0%
|
|-
| style="background-color:"|
| style="text-align:left;" |British Unionist
|859
|0.1%
|
|0
|
|
|
|1
|0.1%
|style=background-color:#dfd|1
|-
| style="background-color:"|
| style="text-align:left;" |Rubbish
|787
|0.0%
|
|0
|
|
|
|1
|0.1%
|
|-
| style="background-color:"|
| style="text-align:left;" |Independence for Scotland
|742
|0.0%
|
|0
|
|
|
|
|0.0%
| 
|-
| style="background-color:"|
| style="text-align:left;" |Libertarian
|698
|0.0%
|
|0
|
|
|
|
|0.0%
|
|-
| style="background-color:"|
| style="text-align:left;" |Freedom Alliance
|555
|0.0%
|
|0
|
|
|
|
|0.0%
| 
|-
| style="background-color:"|
| style="text-align:left;" |Volt UK
|421
|0.0%
|
|0
|
|
|
|
|0.0%
| 
|-
| style="background-color:"|
| style="text-align:left;" |Socialist Labour
|381
|0.0%
|
|0
|
|
|
|
|0.0%
|
|-
| style="background-color:"|
| style="text-align:left;" |UKIP
|372
|0.0%
|0.2%
|0
|
|
|
|
|0.0%
|
|-
| style="background-color:"|
| style="text-align:left;" |Women's Equality
|228
|0.0%
|
|0
|
|
|
|
|0.0%
| 
|-
| style="background-color:"|
| style="text-align:left;" |Social Democratic
|222
|0.0%
|
|0
|
|
|
|
|0.0%
|
|-
| style="background-color:"|
| style="text-align:left;" |Sovereignty
|154
|0.0%
|
|0
|
|
|
|
|0.0%
| 
|-
| style="background-color:"|
| style="text-align:left;" |Communist
|119
|0.0%
|
|0
|
|
|
|
|0.0%
| 
|-
| style="background-color:"|
| style="text-align:left;" |Pensioner's
|75
|0.0%
|
|0
|
|
|
|
|0.0%
| 
|-
| style="background-color:"|
| style="text-align:left;" |Vanguard
|74
|0.0%
|
|0
|
|
|
|
|0.0%
| 
|-
| style="background-color:"|
| style="text-align:left;" |Workers
|61
|0.0%
|
|0
|
|
|
|
|0.0%
| 
|-
| style="background-color:"|
| style="text-align:left;" |Scottish Eco-Federalist
|24
|0.0%
|
|0
|
|
|
|
|0.0%
| 
|- class=sortbottom style="background-color:#E9E9E9; font-weight:bold;"
! colspan="2" style="text-align:left;" | Total
| 1,889,658
| 100.0
| ±0.0
| 32
| 
| 1,223
| 1,227
| 1,227
| 100.00
| 
|}

Council control
Last updated 10 March 2023.

2017 election results

Following boundary changes:

|-style="background-color:#E9E9E9;text-align:center;"
!colspan="2" rowspan="2" width="175"|Party
!colspan="3" rowspan="2" width="175"| First-preference votes
! scope="col" rowspan="2"| Councils
! scope="col" rowspan="2" style="width: 30px;"| +/-
! colspan="2" | 2012 seats
! colspan="2" | 2017 seats
! colspan="2" | Seat change
|-
! Seats won
!  Notional
!  Seats won
! Seat %
!  vs Notional
|-
|- style="text-align:right;"
| style="background-color:"|
| style="text-align:left;" |Scottish National Party
|610,454
|32.3%
| 0.0
|0
| 1
|425
|438
|431
|35.1%
| 7
|- style="text-align:right;"
| style="background-color:"|
| style="text-align:left;" |Conservative
|478,073
|25.3%
| 12.0%
|0
| 
|115
|112
|276
|22.5%
| 164
|- style="text-align:right;"
| style="background-color:"|
| style="text-align:left;" |Labour
|380,957
|20.2%
| 11.4%
|0
| 3
|394
|395
|262
|21.4%
| 133
|-
|- style="text-align:right;"
| style="background-color:"|
| style="text-align:left;" |Independents
|199,261
|10.5%
| 1.3%
|3
| 
|196
|198
|172
|14.1%
| 26
|- style="text-align:right;"
| style="background-color:"|
| style="text-align:left;" |Liberal Democrats
|128,821
|6.8%
| 0.2%
|0
| 
|71
|70
|67
|5.5%
| 3
|- style="text-align:right;"
| style="background-color:"|
| style="text-align:left;" |Scottish Greens
|77,682
|4.1%
| 1.8%
|0
| 
|14
|14
|19
|1.6%
| 5
|-
|- style="text-align:right;"
| style="background-color:"|
| style="text-align:left;" |No Overall Control
| —
| —
| —
| 29
|4
| —
| —
| —
| —
| —
|-
! colspan="2" style="text-align:left;" |Total
|style="background-color:#E9E9E9;text-align:right;" | 1,889,658
|style="background-color:#E9E9E9;text-align:right;" |100.0
|style="background-color:#E9E9E9;text-align:right;" | ±0.0
|style="background-color:#E9E9E9;text-align:right;" |32
|style="background-color:#E9E9E9;text-align:right;" | 
|style="background-color:#E9E9E9;text-align:right;" |1,223
|style="background-color:#E9E9E9;text-align:right;" |1,227
|style="background-color:#E9E9E9;text-align:right;" |1,227
|style="background-color:#E9E9E9;text-align:right;" | 100.00
|style="background-color:#E9E9E9;text-align:right;" | 
|}
<noinclude>

Note: There were boundary changes in many of these councils. Notional seats and seat change are based on a notional 2012 result calculated by the BBC. The methodology was officially revealed on 9 May 2017. The relevant explanation is available on the BBC Website. Comparisons with the actual results from 2012 are inconsistent, as the number of seats and seat changes will be different because of an increase in council seats across the country from 1,223 to 1,227 and the different boundaries.

|-style="background-color:#E9E9E9;text-align:center;"
! colspan="2" |Party
! 2012 seats
! 2012 notional
|-
|- style="text-align:right;"
| style="background-color:"|
| style="text-align:left;" |Scottish National Party
|425
|438
|-
|- style="text-align:right;"
| style="background-color:"|
| style="text-align:left;" |Conservative
|115
|112
|-
|- style="text-align:right;"
| style="background-color:"|
| style="text-align:left;" |Labour
|394
|395
|-
|- style="text-align:right;"
| style="background-color:"|
| style="text-align:left;" |Liberal Democrats
|71
|70
|-
|- style="text-align:right;"
| style="background-color:"|
| style="text-align:left;" |Scottish Greens
|14
|14
|-
|- style="text-align:right;"
| style="background-color:"|
| style="text-align:left;" |Others
|204
|198
|-
|-
! colspan="2" style="text-align:left;" |Total
|1,223
|1,227
|-
|}

Council control

Political control may be held by minority governments (min), coalitions (co), joint leadership arrangements (j.l.) or partnership working arrangements (p.w.).

Last update 13 February 2022.

2012 election results

Council control

The 32 unitary authorities were controlled as follows. The figures incorporate the results from the 2012 local government election, plus gains and losses from subsequent local by-elections, and party defections.

2007 election results

Following the introduction of the Local Governance (Scotland) Act 2004 local elections are held using the single transferable vote, with this taking place for the first time in 2007. This change in voting system saw all but five councils end up with no one party in control. Labour retained control of the City of Glasgow and North Lanarkshire, while Orkney, Shetland and Na h-Eileanan Siar continue to be controlled by Independent councillors.

Council control

The 32 unitary authorities are controlled as follows. The figures incorporate the results from the 2007 local government election, plus gains and losses from subsequent local by-elections, and party defections.

Community councils

Community councils represent the interests of local people.  Local authorities have a statutory duty to consult community councils on planning, development and other issues directly affecting that local community.  However, the community council has no direct say in the delivery of services.  In many areas they do not function at all, but some work very effectively at improving their local area. Elections for community councils are determined by the local authority but the law does state that candidates cannot stand on a party-political ticket.

See also
 2022 Scottish local elections
 List of political parties in Scotland
 Subdivisions of Scotland
 Local government in England
 Local government in Northern Ireland
 Local government in Wales
 Business rates in Scotland
 Local income tax
 Convention of Scottish Local Authorities
 Scottish Housing Regulator
 Social care in Scotland
 List of Scottish council areas by population

References

External links
Local Government Scottish Government
Local Government in Scotland
Local Government Boundary Commission for Scotland
Map of the UK counties and unitary administrations
Map of all UK local authorities

 
Administrative divisions of Scotland